Delmas is a small maize farming town situated east of Johannesburg in Mpumalanga, South Africa. The town is located some 19 km north-east of Springs and 73 km south-east of Pretoria.

History
The town was laid out in 1907 on the farm Witklip (Afrikaans for White Stone) and has been administered by a town council since 1965. The name was given by the Frenchman Frank Campbell Dumat, former owner of Witklip, after his grandfather's farm in France. He originally laid out the town with 192 residential stands, 48 4 ha small holdings and 138 ha of commonage but by 1909 the governments added a further 5,500 ha to the town. This would be divided into 85 small holdings of around 64 ha.

Geography

Communities
Bothibelong is a township 3 km north of Delmas. The name is derived from Sotho and means 'protection'. A newer location is named Botleng, which means 'place of beauty' in Sotho.

Economy

Agriculture
The farms in the region produce maize, wheat, potatoes and chickens. AFGRI runs a chicken abattoir in the town.

Sports

Golf 
The Delmas Golf Club is a nine-hole golf course that opened in 1960.

Motorsports 
Red Star Raceway is located approximately 15 km (9.2 mi) outside of Delmas, to the North East of the town centre. Opened in 2010, the 4km (2.4 mi) long circuit was initially designed to house motorcyles but later opened the facilities to cars. Originally developed by the owner, Jaques van Wyngaardt, in conjunction with Andy Farmer and Kevin Owen, the circuit can be run either clockwise or anticlockwise and features a shorter, "Club" circuit, bypassing several of the long circuit's corners. The facility offers a skid pan, recreational facilities as well as overnight accommodation, conference halls and ablution facilities.

In 2022, construction started on a new filling station and convenience store to service both visitors to the track and travellers on the N12 freeway.

Infrastructure

Transportation
Delmas is an important railway junction on the Springs to eMalahleni rail-line, a line that connects to the Port of Richards Bay.

Roads
The town is connected by two main roads, the R555 and the R50. The R50 north connects the town to the N12 freeway junction which links Johannesburg to Witbank while the road continues north to Pretoria. The R50 south connects the town to Standerton.

References

Populated places in the Victor Khanye Local Municipality
Populated places established in 1907